Aksheyaa College of Arts and Science is a private Arts and Science college in the state of Tamil Nadu, India.

Gallery

References

External links

Engineering colleges in Chennai